This is a list of Canadian films which were released in 1980:

See also
 1980 in Canada
 1980 in Canadian television

1980
1980 in Canadian cinema
Canada